Silver Hill or Silverhill could refer to:

Canada
 Silver Hill, Ontario, a hamlet in Norfolk County
 Silverhill, British Columbia, Canada, a neighbourhood in the District of Mission

Guyana
 Silver Hill, Guyana

Republic of Ireland
 Silver Hill, Donegal, a 600 m peak in County Donegal, Ireland

United Kingdom and its oversea territories

England
 Silverhill, Hastings, an area  of Hastings, East Sussex
 Silverhill, Nottinghamshire, a former colliery and reclaimed spoil heap

Northern Ireland
 Silverhill, County Fermanagh, a townland in County Fermanagh
 Silverhill, County Tyrone, a townland in County Tyrone

Montserrat
 Silver Hill, Montserrat - a mountain on the Caribbean island of Montserrat

United States
 Silverhill, Alabama, a small town in Baldwin County, Alabama
 Silver Hill, Arkansas, a town in Searcy County, Arkansas
 Silver Hill Hospital, a private psychiatric hospital in New Canaan, Connecticut
 Silver Hill, Chattooga County, Georgia, an unincorporated community
 Silver Hill, Maryland, a census-designated place in Prince George's County
Paul E. Garber Preservation, Restoration, and Storage Facility (nicknamed "Silver Hill"), repair and storage facility of the Smithsonian National Air and Space Museum at Silver Hill, Maryland
 Silver Hill Historic District (Weston, Massachusetts), in the town of Weston, Middlesex County, Massachusetts
 Silver Hill (MBTA station), Weston, Middlesex County, Massachusetts
Silver Hill, Albuquerque, a neighborhood in Albuquerque, New Mexico
Silver Hill Historic District (Albuquerque, New Mexico)
 Silver Hill, North Carolina, an unincorporated community in Davidson County, North Carolina